Jim Watson is a Canadian actor. He is best known for his roles as Pat in the television series Between, and Theo in Transplant.

Originally from North Bay, Ontario, he studied acting at the George Brown Theatre School. He currently lives in Hamilton with his wife, musician Danielle Beaudin of the band The Redhill Valleys.

He has also had recurring roles in the television series Copper, The Strain, Mary Kills People and Slasher, and guest roles on Murdoch Mysteries, Saving Hope, Good Witch, Frankie Drake Mysteries and Hudson & Rex.

References

External links

21st-century Canadian male actors
Canadian male television actors
Canadian male film actors
Male actors from Hamilton, Ontario
People from North Bay, Ontario
George Brown College alumni
Living people
Year of birth missing (living people)